Masayu Anastasia (born January 19, 1984) is an Indonesian model and actress. She starred in "Juleha Anak Betawi Asli", Gengsi Gede-gedean, Haruskah Ku Mati, Laila, Karunia-Mu, Setetes Embun, Doiku Beken, Cinta Merah Jambu and the movie Buruan Cium Gue and Selamanya. She was also cast as a model in music videos for Peterpan and Ressa Herlambang.

Personal life
On July 6, 2008, Masayu married Lembu Wiworo Jati, the lead vocal of Club Eighties band, . On October 19, 2009 both got a daughter, Samara Anaya Amandari. But on August 31, 2015, Masayu proposed to divorce at South Jakarta Islamic Court.

Filmography 
 Buruan Cium Gue (2004)
 Selamanya (2007)
 Kawin Kontrak (2008)
 Pengantin Topeng (2010)
 Laskar Pemimpi (2010)
 Susah Jaga Keperawanan di Jakarta (2010)
 Cinta di Saku Celana (2012)
 Rayya, Cahaya Diatas Cahaya (2012)

Soap operas (TV series) 
 Janji Hati
 Jangan Ucapkan Cinta
 ABG 1&2
 Setetes Embun
 Gengsi Gede-Gedean
 The Pakis 2
 Doiku Beken
 KaruniaMu
 Gadis Korek Api
 Toyib Minta Kawin 
 Haruskah Ku Mati
 Laila
 Inikah Cinta
 Cinta Merah Jambu
 Aku Bukan Dia
 Dewa
 Putri yang Ditukar
 Itsnaini (2012) [SOON]
 Putri Bidadari (2012–2013)
 Cinta dilangit taj mahal (2015)

FTV 
 Cinta 117 kg
 Cinta Ke 50 (With Calvin Ray)
 Bos Ku Malang Bos Ku Sayang(With Vino Bastian)
 Sopir Taksi Jatuh Cinta (With Mike Lewis)
 Suamimu Suamiku Juga (With Adam Jordan)
 Bidadari Pencuri Sandar (With Marcell Darwin Lia Waode Eva Anindhita Tamara Bleszynski as Tania  Play Wonosobo Central Java
 Juleha Kaya Mendadak (With Ibnu Jamil)
}}

Brand ambassador

References

External links 
 Profile in CumiCumi.com

1984 births
Indonesian actresses
Living people
Indonesian Muslims